Choctaw Valley is the name of multiple neighborhoods and a census-designated place (CDP) in Kern County, California.

Choctaw Valley sits mostly on the north bank of the Kern River, or straddles the river until it abuts the Alfred Harrell Hwy.

The area is in the Bakersfield CCD and ZIP Code Tabulation Area 93308.

The neighborhoods belong to the nearby communities of Bakersfield and Rivergrove.

Census-designated place 
The CDP of Choctaw Valley was first listed in the 2020 census, at which time it had a population of 237 in 48 households.

93308 
In the larger ZIP Code Tabulation Area that encompasses the area, there was a population of 52,447 at the 2020 census and 54,857 for the 2021 American Community Survey 5-Year estimate.

References

External links 
 Choctaw Valley CDP, California on U.S. Census Bureau